Abdelilah Hamdouchi (born 1958) is a Moroccan writer. He was born in Meknes. He is a prolific writer of crime thrillers, several of which have been translated into English. He lives in Rabat.

Selected works
 Whitefly, translated by Jonathan Smolin
 The Final Bet, translated by Jonathan Smolin
 Bled Dry, translated by Benjamin Smith

References

Moroccan writers
1958 births
Living people
People from Rabat
People from Meknes
Date of birth missing (living people)